The men's triple jump at the 1978 European Athletics Championships was held in Prague, then Czechoslovakia, at Stadion Evžena Rošického on 3 September 1978.

Medalists

Results

Final
3 September

Participation
According to an unofficial count, 15 athletes from 9 countries participated in the event.

 (1)
 (1)
 (1)
 (2)
 (1)
 (1)
 (3)
 (2)
 (3)

References

Triple jump
Triple jump at the European Athletics Championships